Joseph Wiley Jr. (August 27, 1918 – March 13, 1993) was an American Negro league infielder in the late 1940s.

A native of New Orleans, Louisiana, Wiley made his Negro leagues debut in 1947 for the Baltimore Elite Giants, and played for the Birmingham Black Barons the following season. In 1950 and 1951, he played in the Mandak League for the Elmwood Giants and the Carman Cardinals. Wiley died in New Orleans in 1993 at age 74.

References

External links
 and Seamheads
 Joe Wiley at Negro League Baseball Players Association

1918 births
1993 deaths
Baltimore Elite Giants players
Birmingham Black Barons players
Baseball players from New Orleans
20th-century African-American sportspeople
Baseball infielders